Billbergia euphemiae is a plant species in the genus Billbergia. This species is native to Brazil.

Cultivars
 Billbergia 'Eipperii'
 Billbergia 'Joyous'
 Billbergia 'Violet Queen'

References

BSI Cultivar Registry Retrieved 11 October 2009

euphemiae
Endemic flora of Brazil
Flora of the Atlantic Forest
Garden plants of South America